Austria men's national goalball team is the men's national team of Austria.  Goalball is a team sport designed specifically for athletes with a vision impairment.  The team takes part in international competitions.

Paralympic Games  
 

The 1976 Summer Paralympics were held in Toronto, Canada.  The team was one of seven teams participating, and they finished first overall. At the 1980 Summer Paralympics in Arnhem, Netherlands, twelve teams took part.  The team finished fourth. New York hosted the 1984 Summer Paralympics where thirteen teams participated and the team finished fifth.

See also 

 Disabled sports 
 Austria women's national goalball team 
 Austria at the Paralympics

References

Goalball men's
National men's goalball teams
Austria at the Paralympics
European national goalball teams